Vice Admiral Sir Hugh Martell,   (6 May 1912 – 25 December 1998) was a Royal Navy officer who served as Admiral Commanding, Reserves. He is best known for his part as commander of Task Force 308 in Operation Mosaic, the series of British nuclear tests in the Monte Bello Islands in Western Australia in 1956.

Biography 
Hugh Colenso Martell was born in Penzance, Cornwall, England, on 6 May 1912, the son of  Albert Arthur Green Martell, an engineer officer in the Royal Navy who reached the rank of captain. He had a brother, Colin Colenso Martell, who also became a Royal Navy officer. He was educated at Edinburgh Academy, and entered the Royal Naval College, Dartmouth in 1926.

Martell became an officer cadet on 1 September 1929, and was commissioned as a midshipman on 1 May 1930. He became an acting sub lieutenant on 20 December 1933, with seniority backdated to 1 March 1933, and was promoted to lieutenant on 1 October 1934. As a junior officer, he served on the cruiser , the battleship , the minesweeper  and the cruiser . On graduation in 1939 he joined the crew of the battleship  as an assistant, where he was serving as an assistant gunnery officer when the Second World War broke out in September.

After Nelson was disabled by a magnetic mine in December 1939, he returned to HMS Excellent. He participated in the Dunkirk evacuation and then joined the cruiser , on which he served in the Arctic convoys. He married Marguérite Isabelle White, the daughter of Sir Rudolph Dymoke White, 2nd Baronet, on 11 January 1941. They had six children: five sons and a daughter. He returned to HMS Excellent for a refresher course in July 1942, and was promoted to lieutenant commander on 1 October 1942. He joined the crew of the aircraft carrier  in October 1943, and served with the East Indies Fleet and the British Pacific Fleet. He was promoted to commander on 30 June 1945. He was mentioned in despatches for his service in the Battle of Okinawa.

He received his first command in 1947, of the destroyer . He served as Commander (G) in the Royal Naval Barracks, Devonport, on the staff of Commander-in-Chief Mediterranean, and as a naval adviser in the Ministry of Supply. He was promoted to captain on 30 June 1952, commanded  and the 7th Frigate Squadron. In 1956 he was appointed to command Task Force 308, which conducted the Operation Mosaic series of British nuclear tests in the Monte Bello Islands in Western Australia, with the temporary rank of commodore, flying his pennant on the Landing Ship, Tank, . He was made a Commander of the Order of the British Empire in the 1957 New Year Honours.

Martell attended the Imperial Defence College at Seaford House, Belgrave Square, and returned to HMS Excellent, this time as its commander. He became the Director of Tactical and Weapons Policy in 1959, and as a naval aide-de-camp to Queen Elizabeth II on 7 January 1961. He was promoted to rear admiral on 8 January 1962, and was appointed Admiral Commanding, Reserves, a post hitherto occupied by a vice-admiral. He had to handle the merger of the Royal Naval Reserve (RNR) with the Royal Naval Volunteer Reserve (RNVR). He hoisted his flag on the retiring cruiser , manned it with a mixed crew of former RNR and RNVR, and sailed it and a small force of coastal minesweepers to Gibraltar for two weeks' intensive training. This was so successful that it became an annual event for many years. He was made a Companion of the Order of the Bath in the  1963 Birthday Honours, and a Knight Commander of the Order of the British Empire in the 1966 Birthday Honours. He was promoted to vice admiral on 16 July 1965. His final posting was as the Chief of Allied Staff, Mediterranean, Aegean and Black Sea. He retired from the navy on 14 December 1967.

In retirement, he worked for  the defence electronics firm Racal, and headed the European operations of Penthouse. His first marriage ended in divorce in 1983. He then married Margaret Glover, with whom he had two sons and six daughters. He appeared before the Australian Royal Commission into British nuclear tests in Australia in 1985. He died in  Cheltenham, Gloucestershire, on 25 December 1998, on the Christmas Day.

Notes 

1912 births
1998 deaths
Royal Navy vice admirals
Companions of the Order of the Bath
Knights Commander of the Order of the British Empire
People educated at Edinburgh Academy
Royal Navy personnel of World War II
Graduates of Britannia Royal Naval College